Cabarita may refer to:

 Cabarita, New South Wales, a suburb of Sydney, Australia
 Cabarita, Victoria, a town in Australia
 Cabarita River, in Jamaica

See also

 Cabarita Beach, New South Wales, a beach in northeastern NSW, Australia
 Cabarita ferry wharf, a wharf on the Parramatta River serving Cabarita, NSW
 Cabarita Reserve ("mission"), an Aboriginal community in New South Wales where former rugby league player Jamal Idris grew up